In the history of Poland, a royal city or royal town was an urban settlement within the crown lands.

The most influential royal cities enjoyed voting rights during the free election period in Poland (1572-1791). These cities were Gdańsk, Warsaw, Kraków, Poznań, Lwów, Wilno, Toruń, Lublin, Kamieniec and Elbląg. Other important royal cities included Gniezno (ecclesiastical capital of Poland and former capital of early medieval Poland), Płock (former capital of medieval Poland), Grodno (general sejm location alongside Warsaw), Bydgoszcz and Piotrków (Crown Tribunal locations alongside Lublin).

Law on the Cities 

On April 18, 1791, the Great Sejm adopted the Free Royal Cities Act (full title: "Miasta nasze królewskie wolne w państwach Rzeczypospolitej" - "Our Free Royal Cities in the States of the Commonwealth"), included as Article III into the Constitution of May 3, 1791.

The law granted a number of privileges for the residents of royal cities. Many of these privileges and rights have already been enjoyed by major royal cities, and the law effectively equalized all royal cities in this respect. It also includes some rights earlier enjoyed only by szlachta.

Royal cities by region

Crown of the Kingdom of Poland

Greater Poland Province

Babimost
Bielsk
Błonie
Bolesławiec
Bolimów
Brdów
Brodnica
Brześć Kujawski
Budzyń
Bydgoszcz
Chorzele
Ciechanów
Czersk
Człopa
Dąbie
Dąbrowice
Dobrzyń nad Wisłą
Elbląg
Garwolin
Gąbin
Gdańsk
Gniezno
Gostynin
Goszczyn
Grabów
Grabów nad Prosną
Grójec
Inowłódz
Inowrocław
Janowo
Kalisz
Kamieńczyk
Kamion
Kcynia
Kłecko
Kłodawa
Kolno
Koło
Konin
Kopanica
Kościan
Kowal
Kowalewo Pomorskie
Latowicz
Liw
Łęczyca
Łomża
Maków Mazowiecki
Mikstat
Mława
Mszczonów
Nakło nad Notecią
Nieszawa
Nowa Brzeźnica
Nowogród
Nur
Oborniki
Odolanów
Osieck
Osmolin
Ostrołęka
Ostrów
Ostrzeszów
Pajęczno
Piaseczno
Piła
Piotrków
Płock
Płońsk
Pobiedziska
Poznań
Przasnysz
Przedecz
Pyzdry
Radomsko
Radziejów
Radziłów
Rawa
Rogoźno
Różan
Rypin
Serock
Sieradz
Skwierzyna
Sochaczew
Sochocin
Solec
Sompolno
Stanisławów
Stawiszyn
Sulmierzyce
Szadek
Szczerców
Śrem
Środa Wielkopolska
Toruń
Tuszyn
Wałcz
Warka
Warsaw
Warsaw New Town
Warta
Wąsosz
Wieluń
Wiskitki
Wizna
Wschowa
Wyszogród
Zakroczym
Zambrów
Zgierz

Lesser Poland Province

Augustów
Bar (today part of Ukraine)
Belz (today part of Ukraine)
Berezan (today part of Ukraine)
Będzin
Bila Tserkva (today part of Ukraine)
Biecz
Bielsk
Bobrovytsia (today part of Ukraine)
Bohuslav (today part of Ukraine)
Bracław (today part of Ukraine)
Brańsk
Busk (today part of Ukraine)
Chełm
Chęciny
Chmielnik
Khmilnyk (today part of Ukraine)
Chyhyryn (today part of Ukraine)
Cherkasy (today part of Ukraine)
Chervonohorod (today part of Ukraine)
Częstochowa
Dobrotvir (today part of Ukraine)
Drohiczyn
Dubienka
Goniądz
Grabowiec
Grybów
Haisyn (today part of Ukraine)
Horodło
Yahotyn (today part of Ukraine)
Yaltushkiv (today part of Ukraine)
Kamianets-Podilskyi (today part of Ukraine)
Kaniv (today part of Ukraine)
Kazimierz
Kazimierz Dolny
Kęty
Kiev (today part of Ukraine)
Kleparz
Kleszczele
Kłobuck
Knyszyn
Korsun (today part of Ukraine)
Koszyce
Kovel (today part of Ukraine)
Kozienice
Kraków
Krasnystaw
Kremenets (today part of Ukraine)
Krzepice
Lanckorona
Letychiv (today part of Ukraine)
Lelów
Leżajsk
Lityn (today part of Ukraine)
Lubaczów
Liubech (today part of Ukraine)
Lublin
Liuboml (today part of Ukraine)
Lviv (today part of Ukraine)
Łosice
Lutsk (today part of Ukraine)
Łuków
Małogoszcz
Mielnik
Mostyska (today part of Ukraine)
Mylianovychi (today part of Ukraine)
Myrhorod (today part of Ukraine)
Narew
Nova Ushytsia (today part of Ukraine)
Nowy Korczyn
Nowy Sącz
Nowy Targ
Olkusz
Olsztyn
Opoczno
Oster (today part of Ukraine)
Oświęcim
Ovruch (today part of Ukraine)
Parczew
Pereiaslav (today part of Ukraine)
Pierzchnica
Pilzno
Piwniczna
Podgórze
Połaniec
Potelych (today part of Ukraine)
Proskuriv (today part of Ukraine)
Proszowice
Przedbórz
Przemyśl
Radom
Radoszyce
Rajgród
Ratne (today part of Ukraine)
Rohatyn (today part of Ukraine)
Ropczyce
Sambir (today part of Ukraine)
Sandomierz
Sanok
Shchurovychi (today part of Ukraine)
Słomniki
Smotrych (today part of Ukraine)
Sokal (today part of Ukraine)
Solec nad Wisłą
Stebliv (today part of Ukraine)
Stężyca
Stopnica
Stoianiv (today part of Ukraine)
Staryi Sambir (today part of Ukraine)
Stryi (today part of Ukraine)
Suraż
Svunyukhi (today part of Ukraine)
Szydłów
Trakhtemyriv (today part of Ukraine)
Tykocin
Tymbark
Tyszowce
Ulaniv (today part of Ukraine)
Urzędów
Uście Solne
Velyki Mosty (today part of Ukraine)
Vinnytsia (today part of Ukraine)
Volodymyr-Volynskyi (today part of Ukraine)
Vyshnivka (today part of Ukraine)
Wąwolnica
Wieliczka
Wiślica
Wolbrom
Zbuczyn
Zhydachiv (today part of Ukraine)
Zhytomyr (today part of Ukraine)
Zvenyhorodka (today part of Ukraine)
Zwoleń

Grand Duchy of Lithuania

Adelsk (today part of Belarus)
Astryna (today part of Belarus)
Azarychy (today part of Belarus)
Azyory (today part of Belarus)
Berżniki (today part of Poland)
Babruysk (today part of Belarus)
Braslaw (today part of Belarus)
Brest (today part of Belarus)
Chachersk (today part of Belarus)
Chavusy (today part of Belarus)
Cherykaw (today part of Belarus)
Druskininkai (today part of Lithuania)
Drysa (today part of Belarus)
Drysvyaty (today part of Belarus)
Dyvin (today part of Belarus)
Dzisna (today part of Belarus)
Eišiškės (today part of Lithuania)
Filipów (today part of Poland)
Gomel (today part of Belarus)
Grodno (today part of Belarus)
Haradnaya (today part of Belarus)
Hieraniony (today part of Belarus)
Hozha (today part of Belarus)
Jałówka (today part of Poland)
Janów (today part of Poland)
Jeleniewo (today part of Poland)
Jurbarkas (today part of Lithuania)
Kalinkavichy (today part of Belarus)
Kamyenyets (today part of Belarus)
Kaunas (today part of Lithuania)
Khotsimsk (today part of Belarus)
Kletsk (today part of Belarus)
Klichaw (today part of Belarus)
Kobryn (today part of Belarus)
Korycin (today part of Poland)
Krasnapolle (today part of Belarus)
Krasnopol (today part of Poland)
Krynki (today part of Poland)
Krychaw (today part of Belarus)
Lahishyn (today part of Belarus)
Lazdijai (today part of Lithuania)
Lida (today part of Belarus)
Lipnishki (today part of Belarus)
Lunna (today part of Belarus)
Łomazy (today part of Poland)
Malyech (today part of Belarus)
Masty (today part of Belarus)
Mazyr (today part of Belarus)
Milejczyce (today part of Poland)
Minsk (today part of Belarus)
Mogilev (today part of Belarus)
Motal (today part of Belarus)
Mstsibava (today part of Belarus)
Mstsislaw (today part of Belarus)
Myadzyel (today part of Belarus)
Novy Dvor (today part of Belarus)
Opsa (today part of Belarus)
Orsha (today part of Belarus)
Parychy (today part of Belarus)
Pinsk (today part of Belarus)
Piszczac (today part of Poland)
Polotsk (today part of Belarus)
Porazava (today part of Belarus)
Prapoysk (today part of Belarus)
Pruzhany (today part of Belarus)
Przerośl (today part of Poland)
Pyerabroddzye (today part of Belarus)
Pryvalki (today part of Belarus)
Radashkovichy (today part of Belarus)
Radun (today part of Belarus)
Rahachow (today part of Belarus)
Rechytsa (today part of Belarus)
Sharashova (today part of Belarus)
Skidzyel’ (today part of Belarus)
Sokółka (today part of Poland)
Suchowola (today part of Poland)
Surazh, Vitebsk Voivodeship (today part of Belarus)
Szczebra (today part of Poland)
Šventoji (today part of Lithuania)
Traby (today part of Belarus)
Trakai (today part of Lithuania)
Usvyaty (today part of Russia)
Vasilishki (today part of Belarus)
Vawkavysk (today part of Belarus)
Velizh (today part of Russia)
Vilniaus (today part of Lithuania)
Virbalis (today part of Lithuania)
Vištytis (today part of Lithuania)
Vitebsk (today part of Belarus)
Vladislavovas (today part of Lithuania)
Voŭpa (today part of Belarus)
Wasilków (today part of Poland)
Wiżajny (today part of Poland)
Wohyń (today part of Poland)

Royal castles and residences
Examples of Polish royal castles and residences found in former royal cities of Poland:

Old towns
Examples of Polish royal cities historic centers include:

See also
Royal burgh
Royal town (disambiguation)
Royal free city, Hungary

References

Legal history of Poland